Edmond Burat de Gurgy, real name Edmond François Célestin Burat de Gurgy, (1810 – 7 March 1840) was a French writer and playwright.

His plays were presented on the most significant Parisian stages of his time as soon as 1830 (Folies-Dramatiques, Théâtre de l'Ambigu-Comique etc.) when sick with tuberculosis in December 1839, he died untimely three months later

Works 
1830: Un duel sous Charles IX. Scène historique du XVIe siècle
1831: La Prima Donna et le garçon boucher, with Clément Burat de Gurgy
1831: Les Deux modistes, with Clément Burat de Gurgy
1832: Le Lit de camp, scènes de la vie militaire, with Clément Burat de Gurgy
1834: Paris, un bal
1834: Byron à l'école d'Harrow, episode mixed with distincts, with Hippolyte Cogniard
1834: Paillasse, episode of carnaval
1835: Le Fils de Figaro, comédie en vaudevilles in 1 act, with Victor Masselin
1835: Le Fils de Triboulet, comédie en vaudevilles in 1 act, with H. Cogniard
1836: Le diable boiteux, ballet pantomime in 3 acts, with Casimir Gide and Jean Coralli
1836: La Jeunesse d'un grand roi, historical episode in 1 act, mixed with distincts
1836: Trois cœurs de femmes, vaudeville in 3 acts, with Adolphe d'Ennery and Achille d'Artois
1837: Biographie des acteurs de Paris
1837: Tabarin, ou un Bobêche d'autrefois, fantaisie in 1 act, mixed with song
1838: La Chambre et le fauteuil de Molière
1839: Le bonheur sous les toits, vaudeville in 3 acts
1840: Le Chasseur de la Montagne, tyrolienne, lyrics by Edmond Burat de Gurgy, music by Charles Haas
1840: Les deux filles de l'air, puff in 2 acts, with Achille Gastaldy

In addition, he participated to the collective book, Paris au XIXe siècle. Recueil de scènes de la vie parisienne dessinées d'après nature, Beauger, 1839.

Bibliography 
 Auguste Brun, Le romantisme et les Marseillais, 1939, p. 102
 Joseph Marc Bailbé, Le roman et la musique en France sous la monarchie de Juillet, 1969, p. 207
 Le Charivari, 18 June 1840 issue (obituary and portrait)
 Jean-Louis Tamvaco, Ivor Forbes Guest, Les cancans de l'Opéra, 2000, p. 82
 Marie-Eve Thérenty, Mosaïques: être écrivain entre presse et roman, 1829-1836, 2003, p. 649

References 

 

19th-century French dramatists and playwrights
French opera librettists
Writers from Marseille
1809 births
1840 deaths